Michael "Boogaloo Shrimp" Chambers (born November 13, 1967) is an American dancer and actor, known for his role as "Turbo" in the 1984 film Breakin' and its sequel Breakin' 2: Electric Boogaloo, in which he is credited as "Boogaloo Shrimp". Chambers rose to fame during the Hollywood phase of popping, boogaloo and robot dancing, as well as the freestyle art of b-boying. Chambers, along with his Breakin' series co-star Adolfo "Shabba Doo" Quiñones and other dancers from the films, were prominently featured in the music videos for Lionel Richie's "All Night Long" (1983) and Chaka Khan's "I Feel for You" (1984).

Early life and influences
Born in Wilmington, California, Chambers is the youngest of four. He grew up in a small town, but a community with a diverse mix of ethnic groups and cultures. In 1978, while at junior high, Chambers would see a member of the Samoan American dance group Blue City Strutters perform. The group would heavily influence Chambers' style, performing King Tut and domino routines and bringing dance styles from San Jose and San Francisco to South Bay Los Angeles. Initially, he formulated his style of dance through his interest in fantasy and sci-fi television shows, including the work of Ray Harryhausen and other stop-motion experts. He credits his older brother with introducing him to the "moonwalk", a move he would later perfect and share with pop superstar Michael Jackson, as well as his signature style of animated popping.

While still a teenager, Chambers' older brother would take him to the Redondo Beach, California pier where he would perform his moves for money, earning hundreds of dollars through his street performances. To solve the problem of anonymity, Chambers' sister gave him a jacket that read "Mike a.k.a. Boogaloo Shrimp", his street dancing name. Chambers' dancing would increasingly draw the attention of promoters, and particularly Adolfo "Shabba Doo" Quiñones, who was seeking to form a new dance troupe after the breakup of his previous group, The Lockers.

Chambers would also meet other popping/dance legends during this time, including Bruno "Pop N Taco" Falcon and Timothy "Popin' Pete" Solomon. Falcon and Chambers would share ideas and styles, building upon their own individual foundations. Both would later be featured in videos and movies, including the Breakin' series.

Career

Chambers' early stints in professional dancing were through television commercials, followed by an appearance in the music video for Lionel Richie's "All Night Long". He made further appearances in the videos for Chaka Khan's "I Feel For You", Richard Marx' "Children of the Night", Stacey Q's "Give You All My Love" and Paula Abdul's "Opposites Attract", where he played the character MC Skat Kat and was assistant choreographer. In 1985, he co-starred in "Stop the Madness", an anti-drug music video sponsored by the Reagan administration, featuring several famous musicians, actors and athletes. He also appeared in such films as Bill & Ted's Bogus Journey (1991)—as a dancing robot—Naked Gun : The Final Insult (1994) and Dudley Do-Right (1999). He also appeared as Urkel-Bot in two episodes of the television show Family Matters: "Robo-Nerd" and "Robo-Nerd II".

Chambers was the announcer on the children' show Fun House from 1990 to 1991. In contrast to his style of dancing, he would dance while "rapping" the opening spiel at the start of the show. He also appeared in Sugar Ray's 1997 video for the song "Fly" and break danced in the video.

Later career
Chambers enjoys teaching and has been invited as a speaker several times to USC's Thorton School of Music. He has also spoken at Santa Monica college, the University of Redlands and gave a surprise visit to Spelman College in Georgia.

As of 2014, Chambers was in talks to do a second sequel to the Breakin franchise. As of 2020, Chambers has been working with independent Chill-Hop artist E-Styles and is set to release a website, as well as music and YouTube pages, featuring vintage and original footage from his career.

Filmography

References

External links
Official website

Comprehensive Interview with Michael Chambers, 17 parts on YouTube'
Cast biography from Breakin

1967 births
Living people
American male dancers
American male film actors
Male actors from Long Beach, California
Popping dancers
People from Wilmington, Los Angeles